UnOrdinary, published on the WEBTOON platform, is a webcomic written by Chelsey Han, better known as "uru-chan" (written only with lowercase letters). It tells the story of a world where almost everyone has a superpower and focuses on an elite school with superpowered teenagers and a lonely boy who doesn't have any powers.

uru-chan has received Ringo Awards three times (2017, 2018 and 2020), all for her work on UnOrdinary.

Awards and nominations

References

Webtoon creators